Xian Dongmei (born September 15, 1975 in Sihui, Zhaoqing, Guangdong) is a female Chinese Judo who competed in the 2004 Summer Olympics and the 2008 Summer Olympics.

A Hakka born in Sihui, she won the gold medal in the half-lightweight class in both the 2004 and 2008 Olympics.

Xian gave birth to a daughter only four months before beginning training for Beijing.

References

External links
 
 
 

1975 births
Living people
Hakka people
Hakka sportspeople
Judoka at the 2004 Summer Olympics
Judoka at the 2008 Summer Olympics
Olympic gold medalists for China
Olympic judoka of China
People from Zhaoqing
Olympic medalists in judo
Asian Games medalists in judo
Sportspeople from Guangdong
Medalists at the 2008 Summer Olympics
Medalists at the 2004 Summer Olympics
Judoka at the 2002 Asian Games
Chinese female judoka
Asian Games silver medalists for China
Medalists at the 2002 Asian Games
Universiade medalists in judo
Guangzhou Sport University alumni
Universiade gold medalists for China